The Corbin Covered Bridge is a wooden covered bridge over the North Branch of the Sugar River on Corbin Road, approximately  west of NH 10 in Newport in Sullivan County, New Hampshire, United States. The bridge was listed on the National Register of Historic Places in 1976, but was removed following its destruction by fire in the early hours of May 25, 1993. It has since been reconstructed.

Description
The bridge rests on stone abutments. The bridge passes  over the water. Its sides are sheathed, the usual means by which the truss elements are protected from the elements.

See also

List of New Hampshire covered bridges
List of bridges on the National Register of Historic Places in New Hampshire
National Register of Historic Places listings in Sullivan County, New Hampshire

References

Covered bridges in New Hampshire
Bridges completed in 1845
Tourist attractions in Sullivan County, New Hampshire
Bridges in Sullivan County, New Hampshire
Road bridges in New Hampshire
Former National Register of Historic Places in New Hampshire
Wooden bridges in New Hampshire
Lattice truss bridges in the United States